The year 1971 involved some significant events in television. Below is a list of notable TV-related events.

Events

January 1 – The final cigarette advertisements are televised in the United States, with the final one occurring during that evening's broadcast of The Tonight Show Starring Johnny Carson on NBC.
January 3 – BBC Open University broadcasts begin in the UK.
January 12 – CBS airs the first episode of All in the Family, with a disclaimer at the beginning of the program warning viewers about potentially offensive content. Within a year, it became television's most popular program, and started a trend toward realism in situation comedies.
January 27 – Valerie Barlow is electrocuted by a faulty hairdryer, and then perishes in a house fire on Coronation Street.
February 23 – The Selling of the Pentagon documentary airs on CBS.
March 2 – On an All in the Family episode, Archie and Edith get brand new next-door neighbors—Michael and Gloria's best friend, Lionel Jefferson (played by Mike Evans) and his parents.  The episode marks Isabel Sanford's first appearance as Louise Jefferson; George Jefferson would not be depicted on-screen until 1973 (by Sherman Hemsley).
March 11 – ABC cancels The Lawrence Welk Show after sixteen years on the network. The show, however, returns to the airwaves in syndication in September, where it would run for another eleven years.
March 16 - CBS releases its schedule for the fall 1971 season, adding new shows with urban/suburban appeal and cancelling what Pat Buttram would later call "every show that had a tree in it," among them Buttram's Green Acres, The Beverly Hillbillies, and Mayberry R.F.D.  Two other victims of CBS' "rural purge," Lassie and Hee Haw, would continue in first-run syndication that fall.
April 3 – RTÉ launches Color television in Ireland with the Eurovision Song Contest 1971, held in Dublin.
April 4 - PBS airs Peter Paul and Mary's "The Song is Love" movie documentary, directed by the most unlikely of people, horror movie's Tobe Hooper.
June 7 – The UK children's magazine show Blue Peter buries a time capsule in the grounds of BBC Television Centre; it would be unearthed on the first episode of the year 2000.
August 1 - The much-acclaimed 6-hour BBC miniseries The Six Wives of Henry VIII, starring Keith Michell as Henry, makes its U.S. premiere; CBS would air it over 6 consecutive Sundays through September 5.
September 13 – U.S. network prime time programming shrinks as the original Prime Time Access Rule takes effect. NBC, unable to take advantage, immediately feels the pinch and fails to win any of the 1971–72 season's first thirteen weeks.
October 2 – Soul Train debuts in syndication. 
October 21 – One-off drama Edna, the Inebriate Woman, starring Patricia Hayes, is shown by BBC One in its Play for Today slot.
November – Top-rated As the World Turns loses the #1 slot in the daytime Nielsens for the first time since 1959.
Michael Zaslow first appears as Roger Thorpe on The Guiding Light.

Programs
60 Minutes (1968–present)
A Charlie Brown Christmas (1965–present, aired annually)
All in the Family (1971–1979)
ABC's Wide World of Sports (1961–1998)
All My Children (1970–2011)
American Bandstand (1952–1989)
Another World (1964–1999)
As the World Turns (1956–2010)
Bewitched (1964–1972)
Blue Peter (UK) (1958–present)
Bonanza (1959–1973)
Bozo the Clown (1949–present)
Bright Promise (1969–1972)
Candid Camera (1948–2014)
Captain Kangaroo (1955–1984)
Charlie Brown's All-Stars (1966–1972, aired annually)
Clangers (UK) (1969–1972)
Come Dancing (UK) (1949–1995)
Coronation Street, UK (1960–present)
Crossroads (UK) (1964–1988, 2001–2003)
Dad's Army (UK) (1968–1977)
Days of Our Lives (1965–present)
Death Valley Days (1952–1975)
Dixon of Dock Green (UK) (1955–1976)
Doctor Who, UK (1963–1989, 1996, 2005–present)
Doomwatch (UK) (1970–1972)
Face the Nation (1954–present)
Famous Jury Trials (1971–1972)
Four Corners (Australia) (1961–present)
General Hospital (1963–present)
Grandstand (UK) (1958–2007)
Gunsmoke (1955–1975)
Hallmark Hall of Fame (1951–present)
Hawaii Five-O (1968–1980)
Hee Haw (1969–1993)
Here's Lucy (1968–1974)
Hockey Night in Canada (1952–present)
Ironside (1967–1975)
It's Academic (1961–present)
It's the Great Pumpkin, Charlie Brown (1966–present, aired annually)
Jeopardy! (1964–1975, 1984–present)
Kimba the White Lion (1966–1967), re-runs
Laugh-In (1968–1973)
Love is a Many Splendored Thing (1967–1973)
Love of Life (1951–1980)
Love, American Style (1969–1974)
Magpie (UK) (1968–1980)
Mannix (1967–1975)
Marcus Welby, M.D. (1969–1976)
Mary Tyler Moore (1970–1977)
McCloud (1970–1977)
Meet the Press (1947–present)
 The Mind of Mr. J.G. Reeder (UK) (1969-1971)
Mission: Impossible (1966–1973)
Mister Rogers' Neighborhood (1968–2001)
Monday Night Football (1970–present)
Monty Python's Flying Circus (UK) (1969–1974)
Mutual of Omaha's Wild Kingdom (1963–1988, 2002–present)
My Three Sons (1960–1972)
One Life to Live (1968–2012)
Opportunity Knocks, UK (1956–1978)
Panorama, UK (1953–present)
Password (1962–1967, 1971–1975, 1979–1982, 1984–1989, 2008–)
Play for Today (UK) (1970–1984)
Play School (1966–present)
Professional Bowlers Tour (1962–1997)
Room 222 (1969–1974)
Search for Tomorrow (1951–1986)
Sesame Street (1969–present)
The Benny Hill Show (1969–1989)
The Brady Bunch (1969–1974)
The Carol Burnett Show (1967–1978)
The Courtship of Eddie’s Father (1969-1972)
The Dean Martin Show (1965–1974)
The Dick Cavett Show (1969–1974)
The Doctors (1963–1982)
The Doris Day Show (1968–1973)
The Edge of Night (1956–1984)
The Flip Wilson Show (1970–1974)
The Good Old Days, UK (1953–1983)
The Guiding Light (1952–2009)
The Late Late Show, Ireland (1962–present)
The Lawrence Welk Show (1955–1982)
The Mike Douglas Show (1961–1981)
The Mod Squad (1968–1973)
The Money Programme (UK) (1966–present)
The Newlywed Game (1966–1974)
The Odd Couple (1970–1975)
The Partridge Family (1970–1974)
The Secret Storm (1954–1974)
The Sky at Night (UK) (1957–present)
The Today Show (1952–present)
The Tonight Show (1954–present; 1962–92 as The Tonight Show Starring Johnny Carson)
The Wonderful World of Disney (1969–79 under this title)
The World Tonight, Philippines (1962–present)
This Is Your Life, UK (1955–2003)
Tom and Jerry (1965–1972, 1975–1977, 1980–1982)
Top of the Pops (UK) (1964–2006)
Truth or Consequences (1950–1988)
What the Papers Say (UK) (1956–2008)
What's My Line? (1968–1975, syndicated version)
Where the Heart Is (1969–1973)
World of Sport (UK) (1965–1985)
Z-Cars, UK (1962–1978)

Debuts
January 10 – Masterpiece Theatre on PBS (1971–)
January 12 – All in the Family on CBS (1971–79)
April 2 – The Return of Ultraman on TBS in Japan (1971–72)
April 3 – Kamen Rider on MBS in Japan (1971–73)
April 10 – The Two Ronnies on BBC1 in the UK (1971–87)
June 19 - Parkinson on BBC1 (1971–82, 1987–88, 1998–2004, then on ITV from 2004 to 2007)
 July 4 - The Cat in the Hat (TV special) on CBS (1971)
August 1 – The Sonny & Cher Comedy Hour on CBS (1971–74)
September 11 –
Sabrina, the Teenage Witch (1971–72) and Help! It's the Hair Bear Bunch (1971–74) both on CBS Saturday Morning.
The Jackson 5ive (1971–73), The Funky Phantom (1971–72), and Lidsville (1971–73), all on ABC Saturday Morning.
September 15 - Columbo (1971–78) as part of a rotation of detective shows on the NBC Mystery Movie
September 17 –
McMillan & Wife on NBC (1971–77)
O'Hara, U.S. Treasury on CBS (1971–72)
September 18 – The New Dick Van Dyke Show on CBS (1971–74)
September 19 – The Jimmy Stewart Show on NBC (1971–72)
September 21 – The Old Grey Whistle Test on BBC2 (1971–87)
October 2 – Soul Train, the African-American equivalent to American Bandstand (1971–2006)
October 10 – Upstairs, Downstairs in the UK on ITV (1971–75, 2010–)
October 25 – The Electric Company, a skit-based children's program aimed at teaching reading skills, on PBS (1971–77)

Ending this year

Changes of network affiliation

Births

Deaths

References